Bodyshockers (also known from the second series onwards as Bodyshockers: Nips, Tucks and Tattoos) is a Channel 4 documentary series fronted by Andover-born presenter, author, and acid attack survivor Katie Piper. The programme meets people from across the United Kingdom who either regret past cosmetic surgery or body art procedures and wish these to be reversed, or who are planning to undergo such procedures, often for the first time: in each edition, one of those planning to undergo the modification will meet with one of those who plans reversal of similar work, in order to discuss the potential pitfalls of said surgery. Bodyshockers first aired in early 2014; a second series followed in 2015 and a third season began airing in January 2016. The program is the first of Katie Piper's Channel 4 projects to be reordered beyond its initial run.

History 

In the spring of 2013 it was announced that Katie Piper would be involved in two new projects for Channel 4, to be produced by Endemol-owned production outfit Remarkable Television. One of these was a live fashion series helmed by Gok Wan; this show, Gok Live: Stripping for Summer aired in early summer 2013. The other project announced around the same time was a Piper-fronted documentary project, then going by the working title Undo Me, which was to look at cosmetic and surgical procedures, and give advice to those looking to restore a more natural look having previously undergone treatments they now regret. It was initially anticipated that Undo Me would broadcast in late 2013 as a series of six programmes.

The new programme developed as Undo Me eventually came to air in early 2014 having been reduced to a four-part run and acquired the new title Bodyshockers: each episode of the initial run also received a sub-title relating to one of the themes covered in the episode (though this led to two editions both titled My Tattoo Hell.) Episodes were transmitted weekly on Thursday nights from 30 January 2014.

In summer 2014 it was confirmed that a second series of Bodyshockers had been commissioned by Channel 4 - the new episodes entered production in autumn 2014 for a scheduled transmission early in 2015. Bodyshockers thus becomes the first of Piper's programmes to be reordered by C4 for a second run. This second series has seen the demise of on-air episode titles, as the show has acquired the sub-title "Nips, Tucks and Tattoos" for all transmitted episodes, but individual episode titles continue to be listed on the Channel 4 website. The second series began transmitting on Monday nights from 5 January 2015, transferring to Wednesday nights part-way through the run.

In February 2015, part-way through the broadcast run of series two, it was confirmed that a third series of Bodyshockers had been ordered by Channel 4.

Past episodes of Bodyshockers have been re-run on Channel 4, 4seven and E4.

Episode guide

Series one

Series two 
The individual episode titles listed for this series are those as given on the Channel 4 website - on-screen, all episodes were subtitled Nips, Tucks and Tattoos.

Series three 

A third series, slated to contain eight episodes, was produced in 2015 for transmission from the start of 2016. This series introduces a new titlecard, though as for series 2 individual episode titles are not used onscreen - the titles given here are again those given on the C4 web guide. Seven episodes aired weekly on Wednesday nights in January and February 2016, with an eighth held back to follow at a later date, eventually turning up as a standalone broadcast in June, several weeks after Piper's new format Never Seen a Doctor had completed its initial three-part run.

References

External links
Bodyshockers at Channel4.com

2014 British television series debuts
2016 British television series endings
Channel 4 documentary series
2010s British documentary television series
English-language television shows